Kalyandurg revenue division (or Kalyandurg division) is an administrative division in the Anantapur district of the Indian state of Andhra Pradesh. It is one of the 5 revenue divisions in the district with 11 mandals under its administration. The divisional headquarters is located at Kalyandurg.

History 

Kalyandurg revenue division in old Anantapur district

Administration 
There are 11 mandals administered under Anantapur revenue division are:

See also 
List of revenue divisions in Andhra Pradesh

References 

Revenue divisions in Anantapur district